Keekle Colliers' Platform railway station was opened by the Cleator and Workington Junction Railway (C&WJR) in July 1910, closed the following January, reopened in June 1913 then closed for good on 1 October 1923. The halt was provided to enable residents of the isolated Keekle Terrace, less than 100 yds from the track, to get to and from work at the equally isolated Walkmill Colliery and coke ovens in Cumbria, England. The Platform is not shown by Jowett.

The halt consisted of two wooden platforms. It was unstaffed and had no shelter or toilet, but each platform carried a lone oil lamp. Publications both official and authoritative variously refer to the halt as Keekle Colliers' Platform, Keekle Colliers Platform and Keekle Halt.

The halt did not appear in public timetables. Its purpose was to bring workers to and from the remote colliery, but on at least one occasion a passenger special called to take children to and from a Sunday School outing at St Bees. Further research is needed to establish exactly when services to the halt ended, as Butt differs from Croughton et al., who state it was still being used in October 1923.

History
The line was one of the fruits of the rapid industrialisation of West Cumberland in the second half of the nineteenth century, being specifically born as a reaction to oligopolistic behaviour by the London and North Western and Whitehaven, Cleator and Egremont Railways.

All lines in the area were primarily aimed at mineral traffic, notably iron ore, coal and limestone, none more so than the C&WJR's line to Workington, which earned the local name "The Track of the Ironmasters". General goods and passenger services were provided, but were very small beer compared with mineral traffic.

The founding Act of Parliament of June 1878 confirmed the company's agreement with the Furness Railway that the latter would operate the line for one third of the receipts.

Services
Passenger trains consisted of antiquated Furness stock hauled largely by elderly Furness engines referred to as "rolling ruins" by one author after a footplate ride in 1949.

No Sunday passenger service was ever provided on the line.

The initial passenger service in 1879 consisted of
two Up (northbound) trains a day, leaving  at 09:20 and 13:45, calling at Cleator Moor,  and terminating at Workington, taking 30 minutes in all.
they returned as Down trains, leaving Workington at 10:30 and 16:00

The service was extended to run to and from Siddick and an extra train was added, with
 three up trains a day, leaving Moor Row at 07:40, 10:12 and 14:45, taking 30 minutes to Workington and an extra four to proceed to Siddick, where connections were made with the MCR.
 Down trains left Siddick at 08:45, 12:22 and 17:00

By 1922 the service reached its high water mark, with:
 five up trains a day from Moor Row through to Siddick, leaving Moor Row at 07:20, 09:50, 13:15, 16:50 and 1820.
 one Saturdays Only train leaving Cleator Moor (NB not from Moor Row) at 12:50 for Workington
 one Saturdays Only train leaving Moor Row at 19:35 for Workington

Although not serving Keekle, two Saturdays Only trains left  at 16:05 and 21:35 for Workington, calling at Distington and High Harrington, with balancing workings leaving Workington at 15:30 and 21:00.

As with advertised passenger trains, in 1920 workmen's trains ran on the company's three southern routes:
 between Workington Central and Lowca using the Lowca Light Railway
 on the "main line" between Siddick Junction and Moor Row
 from Siddick Junction to Moor Row, calling at all passenger stations except , calling at  instead 
The situation in 1922 was similar.

The 1920 Working Time Table shows relatively few Goods trains, none of which called at Keekle.

Mineral traffic was an altogether different matter, dwarfing all other traffic in volume, receipts and profits. The key source summarises it "...the 'Track of the Ironmasters' ran like a main traffic artery through an area honeycombed with mines, quarries and ironworks." The associated drama was all the greater because all the company's lines abounded with steep inclines and sharp curves, frequently requiring banking. The saving grace was that south of Workington at least, most gradients favoured loaded trains. During the First World War especially, the company ran "Double Trains", akin to North American practice, with two mineral trains coupled together and a banking engine behind, i.e. locomotive-wagons-guards van-locomotive-wagons-guards van-banker. The practice was discontinued after dark from 1 April 1918.

The workings at Keekle Colliers' Platform exemplified the line's role, enabling coke and coal to be won and carried from a remote site to industries near and far.

Like any business tied to one or few industries, the railway was at the mercy of trade fluctuations and technological change. The Cumberland iron industry led the charge in the nineteenth century, but became less and less competitive as time passed and local ore became worked out and harder to win, taking the fortunes of the railway with it. The peak year was 1909, when 1,644,514 tons of freight were handled. Ominously for the line, that tonnage was down to just over 800,000 by 1922, bringing receipts of £83,349, compared with passenger fares totalling £6,570.

Rundown and closure
The high water mark for the line's tonnage was 1909, the high water mark for progress was 1913, with the opening of the Harrington and Lowca line for passenger traffic. A chronology of the line's affairs from 1876 to 1992 has almost no entries before 1914 which fail to include "opened" or "commenced". After 1918 the position was reversed, when the litany of step-by-step closures and withdrawals was relieved only by a control cabin and a signalbox being erected in 1919 and the Admiralty saving the northern extension in 1937 by establishing an armaments depot at Broughton.

The halt probably closed in 1923. The line past the site of the platform closed in 1963 and was subsequently lifted.

Afterlife
By 2013 Keekle Terrace and the trackbed through the Platform were readily visible on satellite imagery, especially the striking Keekle Viaduct a short distance to the south.

See also

 Maryport and Carlisle Railway
 Furness Railway
 Whitehaven, Cleator and Egremont Railway
 Cockermouth and Workington Railway

References

Sources

Further reading

External links
Map of the CWJR with photos RAILSCOT
Map of the WC&ER with photos RAILSCOT
The station Rail Map Online
The station on overlain OS maps surveyed from 1898 National Library of Scotland
The site of the Platform on a 1948 OS Map npe maps
The line (Platform not shown) railwaycodes
The railways of Cumbria Cumbrian Railways Association
Photos of Cumbrian railways Cumbrian Railways Association
The railways of Cumbria Railways_of_Cumbria
Cumbrian Industrial History Cumbria Industrial History Society
Furness Railtour using many West Cumberland lines 5 September 1954 sixbellsjunction
A video tour-de-force of the region's closed lines cumbriafilmarchive
1882 RCH Diagram showing the station, see page 173 of the pdf google
Haematite earthminerals
Coal and iron ore mining in Cleator Moor Haig Pit

Disused railway stations in Cumbria
Railway stations in Great Britain opened in 1910
Railway stations in Great Britain closed in 1923
Former Cleator and Workington Junction Railway stations